Discosea is a class of Amoebozoa, consisting of naked amoebae with a flattened, discoid body shape. Members of the group do not produce tubular or subcylindrical pseudopodia, like amoebae of the class Tubulinea. When a discosean is in motion, a transparent layer called hyaloplasm forms at the leading edge of the cell (see lamelliopodium). In some discoseans, short "subpseudopodia" may be extended from this hyaloplasm, but the granular contents of the cell do not flow into these, as in true pseudopodia. Discosean amoebae lack hard shells, but some, like Cochliopodium and Korotnevella secrete intricate organic scales which may cover the upper (dorsal) surface of the cell.  No species have flagella or flagellated stages of life.

The composition of Discosea is similar to that of the class Flabellinea, proposed by Alexey Smirnov and his collaborators in 2005.  However, Discosea is a more comprehensive taxon, including several groups not included in Flabellinea. In 2011, Smirnov et al. accepted Discosea as a class, and reduced Flabellinea to the rank of a subclass with the name Flabellinia.

Taxonomy
Class Discosea Cavalier-Smith 2004 stat. nov. Adl et al. 2018
 Order ?Hyalodiscida 
 Family Hyalodiscidae Page 1976 non Poche 1913
 Order ?Stereomyxida Grell 1971
 Family Stereomyxidae Grell 1966
 Order ?Stygamoebida Smirnov & Cavalier-Smith 2011
 Family Stygamoebidae Cavalier-Smith & Smirnov 2011
 Subclass Centramoebia Cavalier-Smith et al. 2016
 Order Centramoebida Rogerson & Patterson 2002 em. Cavalier-Smith 2004
 Family Balamuthiidae Cavalier-Smith 2004
 Family Acanthamoebidae Sawyer & Griffin 1975 em. Tice et al. 2016
 Order Himatismenida Page 1987 [Cochliopodiida]
 Family Parvamoebidae Cavalier-Smith & Smirnov 2011
 Family Cochliopodiidae Taranek 1882
 Order Pellitida Page 1987
 Family Pellitidae Smirnov & Kudryavtsev 2005
 Family Goceviidae Cavalier-Smith & Smirnov 2011
 Subclass Flabellinia Smirnov & Cavalier-Smith 2011 em. Kudryavtsev et al. 2014
 Order Dactylopodida Smirnov et al. 2005
 Family Paramoebidae Poche 1913 em. Kudryavtsev, Pawlowski & Hausmann 2011
 Family Vexilliferidae Page 1987 em. Kudryavtsev, Pawlowski & Hausmann 2011
 Order Dermamoebida Cavalier-Smith 2004 em. Smirnov & Cavalier-Smith 2011
 Family Dermamoebidae Cavalier-Smith & Smirnov 2011 (Lingulate amoeba)
 Family Mayorellidae Schaeffer 1926 em. Smirnov et al. 2011 
 Order Thecamoebida Schaeffer 1926 em. Smirnov & Cavalier-Smith 2011
 Family Stenamoebidae Cavalier-Smith 2016
 Family Thecamoebidae Chatton 1925 em. Smirnov et al. 2011  (striate & rugose amoeba)
 Order Vannellida Smirnov et al. 2005
 Family Discamoebidae Bovee & Jahn, 1967 ex Jahn, Bovee & Griffith 1974
 Family Vannellidae (Bovee, 1970)

References

External links
Discosea at Ferry Siemensma's Microworld The order Hismatismenida at Penard.com

 
Amoebozoa classes
Taxa named by Thomas Cavalier-Smith